Canada is scheduled to compete at the 2022 World Aquatics Championships in Budapest, Hungary from June 18th to July 3rd, 2022. Canadian athletes competed in all five disciplines held at the championships. Canada's team consisted of 76 athletes.

The Canadian team won 14 medals a record high for one edition of the event, including 11 in swimming, also a new record.

Athletes by discipline
The following is the list of number of competitors participating at the Championships per discipline.

2 female athletes will compete in both open water swimming and in indoor swimming, they are included within the swimming numbers.

Artistic swimming

Canada's 12 member artistic swimming team (all women) was named on June 14, 2022.

Women

Competed in preliminary only

Diving

Canada's diving team consisted of six athletes (three men and three women).

Men

Women

Open water swimming

Canada entered seven open water swimmers (four men and three women). Katrina Bellio and Abby Dunford also competed in the pool competitions. Eric Hedlin was named to the team but did not compete in any event.

Men

Women

Mixed

Swimming

Canada's swimming team consisted of 27 swimmers (10 men and 17 women). The team was selected at the conclusion of the Canadian Swim Trials that were held in Victoria, British Columbia.

Men

Women

Raced in heat only and received medals.

Mixed

Water polo

Canada qualified both a men's and women's team. The men's team qualified for the first time since 2017. On June 24th, the Canadian men's team withdrew from the tournament after multiple positive Covid-19 cases amongst the team.

Summary

Men's tournament

Roster
Canada's roster consisted of 13 athletes.

Milan Radenovic
Brody McKnight 
Nicolas Constantin Bicari
Jeremie Blanchard
Jeremie Cote
Reuel D'Souza
Bogdan Djerkovic
Aleksa Gardijan
Matthew Halajian
Gaelan Patterson
Maxime Schapowal
Aria Soleimanipak
Sean Spooner

Group C

Women's tournament

Roster
Canada's roster consisted of 13 athletes.

Amanada Amorosa
Verica Bakoc
Kyra Christmas
Axelle Crevier
Jessica Gaudreault
Shae La Roche
Rae Lekness
Kelly McKee
Hayley McKelvey
Kindred Paul
Gurpreet Sohi
Clara Vulpisi
Emma Wright

Group A

Playoffs

9–12th place semifinals

9th place match

See also
Canada at the 2022 World Athletics Championships
Canada at the 2022 Commonwealth Games

References

World Aquatics Championships
2019
Nations at the 2022 World Aquatics Championships